Hofgaard is a surname. Notable people with the surname include:

Elias Hofgaard (1856–1906), Norwegian pioneer educator for deaf people
Signe Hofgaard (1901–1998), Norwegian dancer, choreographer and organizational leader
Tor Levin Hofgaard (born 1968), Norwegian psychologist

Norwegian-language surnames